Temporary protection may refer to any of several legal statuses for refugees or displaced people:

 Temporary protected status in the United States
 Temporary Protection Directive in the European Union
 Temporary protection visa in Australia

Refugees